Donatan, (born Witold Marek Czamara on 2 September 1984 in Kraków) is a Polish musician, music producer and sound engineer. Donatan along with Teka co-created RafPak.

Life and career
Donatan was born to a Russian mother and Polish father. He began producing music in 2002, with his debut album "Brudne południe", released in 2007. For eight years Donatan lived in Taganrog, Rostov Oblast, Russia, and has been married since 2004. 
Donatan is a self-declared adherent of Slavic Native Faith and has often been criticized for allegedly preaching pan-Slavism, paganism, satanism, recommending the Red Army, and promoting communist symbols including the hammer and sickle.

In 2013 he has been nominated for Best Polish Act at MTV Europe Music Awards alongside Cleo.

In 2014, it was announced by the Polish broadcaster, Telewizja Polska (TVP) that Donatan along with Cleo would represent Poland in the Eurovision Song Contest 2014, in Copenhagen, Denmark, with the song "My Słowianie".

Discography

Albums

Singles

Music videos

References

See also 
Poland in the Eurovision Song Contest 2014

1984 births
Living people
Eurovision Song Contest entrants for Poland
Polish record producers
Polish keyboardists
Polish people of Russian descent
Eurovision Song Contest entrants of 2014
Polish modern pagans
Performers of modern pagan music